Convoy JW 54A was an Arctic convoy sent from Great Britain by the Western Allies to aid the Soviet Union during World War II. It sailed in November 1943, reaching the Soviet northern ports at the end of the month.
JW 54A was the first out-bound Arctic convoy of the 1943–44 winter season, following their suspension during the summer.
All ships arrived safely.

Forces
JW 54A consisted of 19 merchant ships which departed from Loch Ewe on 15 November 1943.
Close escort was provided by the destroyers Inconstant and Whitehall, and two other vessels. These were supported by seven Home Fleet destroyers led by Onslow (Capt.JA McCoy commanding).
The convoy was also accompanied initially by a local escort group from Britain, and was also joined later by a local escort from Murmansk.
A cruiser cover force comprising Kent (R.Adm AFE Palliser), Jamaica and Bermuda also followed the convoy, to guard against attack by surface units.
Distant cover was provided by a Heavy Cover Force comprising the battleship Anson, the US cruiser Tuscaloosa and four US destroyers.

JW 54A was opposed by a U-boat force of five boats in a patrol line, code-named Eisenbart, in the Norwegian Sea.
A surface force comprising the battleship Scharnhorst and five destroyers was also available, stationed at Altenfjord.

Voyage
JW 54A departed Loch Ewe on 15 November 1943, accompanied by its local escort, of three destroyers, and its close escort.
Three days later, on 18 November, it was joined by the ocean escort, while the local escort departed. At the same time the Cruiser Force and the Distant Cover Force from Scapa Flow also put to sea, taking station in the Norwegian Sea.

The convoy was not sighted by German reconnaissance aircraft, nor by any of the Eisenbart U-boats, and crossed the Norwegian and Barents Seas without incident.

On 24 November JW 54A arrived safely at Kola Inlet.

Conclusion
JW 54A was a successful start to the 1943–44 convoy season, with the safe arrival of 19 merchant ships and the war materiel they carried.

Ships involved

Allied ships

Merchant ships

Copeland 
Daniel Drake 
Edmund Fanning 
Empire Carpenter 
Empire Celia 
Empire Nigel 
Fort Yukon 
Gilbert Stuart 
Henry Villard 

James Gordon Bennet 
James Smith 
Junecrest 
Mijdrecht 
Norlys 
Ocean Vanity 
Ocean verity 
Park Holland 
Thomas Sim Lee 
William Windom 

Close escort
 Whitehall 
 Inconstant
 Heather 
 Hussar

 
Ocean escort
 Onslow
 Onslaught
 Obedient
 Orwell
 Impulsive
 Haida
 Huron
 Iroquois

Cruiser cover force
 Kent (flag)
 Jamaica 
 Bermuda 

Distant cover force
 Anson (flag) 
 Tuscaloosa 
 Corry
 Fitch
 Forrest
 Hobson

Axis ships

 
U-boat force
 U-277  
 U-307
 U-354
 U-360 
 U-387

Surface force
 Scharnhorst 
 Z29 
 Z30 
 Z33 
 Z34 
 Z38

Notes

References
 Clay Blair : Hitler's U-Boat War [Volume 2]: The Hunted 1942–1945 (1998)  (2000 UK paperback ed.)
 Paul Kemp : Convoy! Drama in Arctic Waters (1993) 
 Paul Kemp  : U-Boats Destroyed  ( 1997).  
 Axel Neistle  : German U-Boat Losses during World War II  (1998). 
 Bob Ruegg, Arnold Hague : Convoys to Russia (1992) 
 Bernard Schofield : (1964) The Russian Convoys BT Batsford  ISBN (none)
  JW 54A at Convoyweb

JW 54A